A mobile network operator (MNO), also known as a wireless service provider, wireless carrier, cellular company, or mobile network carrier, is a provider of wireless communications services that owns or controls all the elements necessary to sell and deliver services to an end user, including radio spectrum allocation, wireless network infrastructure, back haul  infrastructure, billing, customer care, provisioning computer systems, and marketing and repair organizations.

Operator
In addition to obtaining revenue by offering retail services under its own brand, an MNO may also sell access to network services at wholesale rates to mobile virtual network operators (MVNO).

A key defining characteristic of a mobile network operator is that an MNO must own or control access to a radio spectrum license from a regulatory or government entity. A second key defining characteristic of an MNO is that it must own or control the elements of the network infrastructure necessary to provide services to subscribers over the licensed spectrum.

A mobile network operator typically also has the necessary provisioning, billing, and customer care computer systems and the marketing, customer care, and engineering organizations needed to sell, deliver, and bill for services. However, an MNO can outsource any of these systems or functions and still be considered a mobile network operator.

See also
List of mobile network operators 
List of telephone operating companies
Mobile phone operator
Mobile virtual network operator
Telephone company

References

Mobile technology
Mobile phone industry